"Ewok Celebration", known commonly as "Yub Nub", is a 1983 song that appears in the end of the Star Wars film Return of the Jedi, during the celebration of the Ewoks on Endor with members of the Rebel Alliance after the destruction of the second Death Star. The song was replaced with a different orchestral piece in the 1997 special edition re-release.

Credits 

"Ewok Celebration" was composed by John Williams, the lyrics in the Ewok language were written by ILM sound designer Ben Burtt. The English lyrics were written by Joseph Williams, who also wrote "Lapti Nek" from the same film. It was published by Bantha Music and is administered by Warner-Tamerlane Publishing Corporation.

Other uses 
In the 1997 Special Edition of the film, a different song ("Victory Celebration") composed by Williams with no lyrics replaces the original version. The song has been used in various other Star Wars media, including the video games Lego Star Wars II: The Original Trilogy and Rogue Squadron III: Rebel Strike.

Other versions 
In 1983, Meco recorded a version of the song "Ewok Celebration" which reached No. 60 on the Billboard Hot 100.

In the Return of the Jedi arcade game released in 1984, the song plays when the player makes the high score list.

The song appears in an episode of the sitcom Spaced; the producers could not acquire the rights to use the original recording, so Edgar Wright and Simon Pegg performed and recorded their own version.

In the movie Vision Quest the song makes an uncredited appearance during one of Louden's matches, being played by a school band.

References

Star Wars film music
Return of the Jedi
Compositions by John Williams
1983 songs